Charles Phillips or Charles Philips may refer to:
Charles Phillips (archaeologist) (1901–1985), British archaeologist
Charles Philips (artist), (ca.1703-1747), English painter
Charles Phillips (businessman) (born 1959), American businessman, CEO of Infor
Charles Phillips (bishop) (died 1906), Nigerian clergyman and Bishop of Ondo
Charles Phillips (figure skater) (born 1938), American figure skater
Charles Phillips (barrister) (1787?–1859), Irish barrister and writer
Charles Phillips (Wisconsin politician, born 1824) (1824–1879), American politician in Wisconsin
Charles D. F. Phillips, British medical doctor (1830–1904)
Charles Franklin Phillips (1910–1998), American economist
Charles James Phillips (1863–1940), Anglo-American philatelist
Charles Henry Phillips (1820–1882), English pharmacist known for his invention Phillips Milk of Magnesia
Charles H. Phillips (1859–1938), American lawyer and politician in Wisconsin
C. E. S. Phillips (Charles Edmund Stanley Phillips, 1871–1945), British radiologist and artist

See also
Charlie Phillips (disambiguation)